Andrew McGillivray (born 19 February 1954) is a former Australian rules footballer who played for the Geelong Football Club in the Victorian Football League (VFL).

Notes

External links 
		

Living people
1954 births
Australian rules footballers from Victoria (Australia)
Geelong Football Club players